Zacherle is a surname. Notable people with the surname include:

Franz Zacherle, Austrian sculptor, born in Hall in Tirol, died around 1790
Thomas Zacherle, Austrian abbot of the monastery of Fiecht
Bonnie Dale Zacherle, American illustrator and designer
John Zacherle (1918–2016), American television personality

John Zacherle is the uncle of Bonnie Dale Zacherle.